Seqizchi (also Romanized as Seqīzchī; also known as Chahār Khānevār and Seqarchī) is a village in Khvoresh Rostam-e Shomali Rural District, Khvoresh Rostam District, Khalkhal County, Ardabil Province, Iran. At the 2006 census, its population was 13, in 4 families.

References 

Towns and villages in Khalkhal County